Torre Europarco (English: "Europarco Tower") is a high-rise building in Rome, Italy. It is 120 metres high and has 30 floors. It is the third-tallest building in the city, after the nearby Torre Eurosky and St. Peter's Basilica. It lies within the Europarco Business Park in Torrino, part of Rome's ninth Municipio, and borders the EUR quarter.

See also 

 List of tallest buildings in Rome

External links 
Top view of a complex

References 

Skyscrapers in Rome
Residential buildings completed in 2012
Residential skyscrapers in Italy